John Archibald Austen (Dover, (Kent), 5 January 1886 – Hythe, Kent, 27 October 1948) was a British book illustrator. He moved to London in 1906 where he studied art. His early works, including a fine Hamlet, were Beardsleyesque in style, but after 1925 he was influenced by the Art Deco movement. Books which he illustrated in this manner include Daphnis and Chloe and As You Like it. His work for Radio Times includes the cover of the Easter 1934 edition.

Austen used several techniques in his illustrations, including wood-engraving and scraperboard, and changed styles to suit the text he was illustrating. He was also involved in advertising, producing adverts, several posters & numerous dustwrapper designs. He was a friend of Alan Odle and Harry Clarke and exhibited with them at the St George's Gallery in 1925. The novelist Dorothy Richardson wife of Alan Odle wrote about him in John Austen and the Inseparables (London: William Jackson, 1930).

Issue 27 of The Imaginative Book Illustration Society's Studies in Illustration contains a biography & full bibliography by Martin Steenson.*

Works illustrated
Includes:
Ralph Holbrook Keen: The Little Ape and Other Stories (Henderson, 1921)
Hugh L’Anson Fausset: The Condemned and The Mercy of God: Two Poems of Crisis (Selwyn & Blount, 1922)
Edward Cracroft Lefroy: Echoes from Theocritus (Selwyn & Blount, 1922)
Charles Perrault: Tales of Passed Times (Selwyn & Blount, 1922)
William Shakespeare: Hamlet (Selwyn & Blount, 1922)
Francis Lawrence Bickley: The Adventures of Harlequin (Selwyn & Blount, 1923)
Jose Maria De Eca De Queiroz: Perfection (Selwyn & Blount, 1923)
Thomas Moult: The Best Poems of 1922 (Cape, 1923)
James Murray Allison: The Five Black Cousins and Other Bird Rhymes (Cape, 1924)
John Austen: Rogues in Porcelain: A Miscellany of 18th Poems (Chapman & Hall, 1924)
Benjamin Disraeli: Ixion in Heaven (Cape, 1925)
Anon: Everyman and Other Plays (Chapman & Hall, 1925)
Longus: Daphnis and Chloe (Bles, 1925)
Thomas Moult: The Best Poems of 1925 (Cape, 1925)
Lord George Gordon Byron: Don Juan (Bodley Head, 1926)
Anatole France: The Gods Are Athirst (Bodley Head, 1926 & 1933)
Laurence Sterne: Tristram Shandy (Bodley Head, 1927)
Gustave Flaubert: Madame Bovary (Bodley Head, 1928)
L’Abbe Prevost: Manon Lescaut (Bles, 1928)
Thomas Moult: The Best Poems of 1928 (Cape, 1928)
Daniel Defoe: Moll Flanders (Bodley Head, 1929) 
Benjamin Disraeli: The Infernal Marriage (William Jackson, 1929)
Norman Douglas: South Wind, 2 Vols (Angus Book Shop, 1929)
Thomas Moult: The Best Poems of 1929 (Cape. 1929)
H. E. Bates: The Hessian Prisoner (William Jackson, 1930)
Villiers David: The Guardsman and Cupid's Daughter (Cayme Press, 1930)
William Shakespeare: As You Like It (William Jackson, 1930)
Pierre Louys: The Collected Tales of Pierre Louys (Chicago: Argus Books, 1930) 
Alfred Benjamin Cooper: Poets in Pinafores: Being Nursery Rhymes Rewritten (Alston Rivers, 1931)
William Makepeace Thackeray: Vanity Fair (Limited Editions Club NY, 1931)
Dorothy Una Ratcliffe: The Gypsy Dorelia: A Pay in 3 Acts (Bodley Head, 1932)
Charles Dickens: The Posthumous Papers of The Pickwick Club, 2 Vols (Limited Editions Club NY, 1933)*
C. C. & D. G.: The English in Love (Secker, 1933)
C. C. & D. G.: A National Gallery, Being a Collection of English Characters (Secker, 1934)
Charles Dickens: David Copperfield (NY: Heritage, 1935)
Tobias Smollett: The Adventures of Peregrine Pickle (Limited Editions Club NY, 1936)
Aristophanes: The Frogs (Limited Editions Club NY, 1937) (NY: Heritage, 1959)
Alaine-Rene LeSage: The Adventures of Gil Blas (Limited Editions Club NY, 1937)
John Austen: The ABC of Pen and Ink Rendering (Pitman, 1937)
Oliver Goldsmith: Oliver Wakefield (NY: Heritage, 1939)
William Shakespeare; Comedy of Errors (Limited Editions Club NY, 1939)
Arnold Bennett: The Old Wives' Tale (Limited Editions Club NY, 1941)
Frederick George Thomas: The Village (OUP, 1943)
Jane Austen: Persuasion (Avalon Press. 1946)
Edmund Spenser: The Faerie Queen, 2 Vols (Limited Editions Club NY, 1953)

References

External links
Biography
Illustrators: Austen
Tristram Shandy, drawing by John Austen
Book Illustration Catalogue

English illustrators
1886 births
1948 deaths
Art Deco artists